Slagle Creek is a stream in Bollinger and Wayne Counties in the U.S. state of Missouri. It is a tributary of Brush Creek.

Slagle Creek has the name of J. A. Slagle, an early settler.

See also
List of rivers of Missouri

References

Rivers of Bollinger County, Missouri
Rivers of Wayne County, Missouri
Rivers of Missouri